Simo Atanacković (born March 11, 1990 in Loznica )  is a  Slovenian-Bosnian professional basketball player for Terme Olimia Podčetrtek of the Slovenian League. He is a 2.07 m tall Forward.

External links
 Eurobasket.com profile
 Fiba Profile

1990 births
Living people
Slovenian men's basketball players
Slovenian people of Bosnia and Herzegovina descent
Slovenian people of Serbian descent
Small forwards
Power forwards (basketball)